Byasa polyeuctes, the common windmill, is the most common member in India of the windmills genus (Byasa), comprising tailed black swallowtail butterflies with white spots and red submarginal crescents.

Range

This butterfly lives in Pakistan, northern ranges of India, Nepal, Bhutan, Myanmar, northern Thailand, Laos, Vietnam, southern China (including Yunnan) and Taiwan.

In India, the Himalayas from Himachal Pradesh to Sikkim, Assam onto Chinese South Tibet region and northern Myanmar.

Status
Overall, the butterfly is not rare. It is common in parts of Sikkim but becomes rarer westwards. It is extremely scarce in Shimla though not rare from Kangra.

In the west it ranges from the Azad Kashmir disputed territory part of the wider Kashmir region of Pakistan and India.

Description

 Length 110 to 140 mm
 Sexes alike
 Black and white above with prominent swallowtail
 Red bodied - tail has a red tip
 Forewings completely black above and below 
 Hindwings crenulated deeply twice on each side of swallowtail. Large oblong white discal spot in 5 (both upperside and underside) and sometimes in 4. Upperside hindwing has irregular marginal red crescents in 1a, 2 and 3 and a small white spot in 4.

Taxonomy
 Atrophaneura philoxenus Gray is considered a synonym.
 A species Atrophaneura lama (Oberthür), described from western China, is regarded as a subspecies of A. polyeuctes (now Byasa) by some.

Subspecies
It has four subspecies, two of which occur in India:
 B. p. polyeuctes Doubleday Sikkim to Myanmar - common
 B. p. philoxenus Gray Kashmir to Nepal - not rare
 B. p. lama (Oberthür, 1876) West China
 B. p. termessus (Fruhstorfer, 1908) Taiwan

Related species
 The three common species of windmills can be recognised by the differences in shape, number and location of white spots.
 Rose windmill, Byasa latreillei, has a white discal band in 2, 3, 4 beyond the cell which is clearly trifurcated by black veins. A slightly smaller butterfly, the rose windmill has rose coloured lunules.
 Great windmill, Byasa dasarada, has a number of two white spots in 4, 5 on the upperside of the hindwing and three spots on 4, 5 and 6 on the underside of the hindwing. It is a slightly larger butterfly with a broader swallowtail.
 Other windmills are smaller, rarer and have small differentiating characters from the above three common windmills. See the individual articles for more information:
 de Nicéville's windmill (Byasa polla, de Nicéville)
 Nevill's windmill (Byasa nevilli, Wood-Mason)
 Black windmill (Byasa crassipes, Oberthür) 
 Chinese windmill (Byasa plutonius, Oberthür), two subspecies of which occur in India.

Habitat
This butterfly prefers forests and woods. It frequents river valleys.

Habits
This butterfly has a leisurely flight high above, but is easily recognisable by the thin long forewings and hindwings. It is attracted to flowers and visits Clemanthe, Buddleia, Lantana and Rhododendron blossoms.

It is mimicked by a day flying moth Epicopa (or Epicopia) polydorus, which flies at the same period and over the same range as the common windmill and has much the same manner and habits.

Life cycle
This species has several broods where it finds suitable climate. It is seen on the wing between April and September. The imago has a foul odour.

Food plants
 Family Nepenthaceae
 Nepenthes species
 Family Aristolochiaceae
 Aristolochia griffithi
 Aristolochia shimadai

See also
Papilionidae
List of butterflies of India
List of butterflies of India (Papilionidae)

References

External links

Global Butterfly Information System text, images including holotypes of hostilius Fruhstorfer, 1908, lama Oberthür, 1876, letincius Fruhstorfer, 1908, punchi Bang-Haas, 1933, roseus Draeseke, 1923 and termessus Fruhstorfer, 1908

Byasa
Butterflies of Asia
Insects of Pakistan
Butterflies described in 1842